Mercy Falls is a book written by William Kent Krueger and published by Atria Books in August 2005, which later went on to win the Anthony Award for Best Novel in 2006.

References 

Anthony Award-winning works
American mystery novels
2005 American novels
Atria Publishing Group books